Salvatore Villanueva is an Italian-American record producer. Villaneuva's first entrance into the New York hardcore scene came when playing in bands including Demonspeed and Murphy's Law. He's currently the bassplayer for Joe Coffee, the new band of ex-Sheer Terror Vocalist Paul Bearer.

Villanueva started producing during the boot camp recording sessions of the New York's Hardest compilation series done at the Big Blue Meenie Recording Studios.  In the fall of 1999, Thursday's lead vocalist, Geoff Rickly, approached Villanueva to produce the band's Eyeball debut Waiting. Since then he has produced almost all of the band's recordings, including War All the Time for Island/Def Jam.
 
Following the success of Thursday's Full Collapse, Victory Records approached Villanueva to work with and develop Long Island emo band, Taking Back Sunday. The band's debut album, Tell All Your Friends, sold over 900,000 copies and became Victory's fastest and biggest selling record to date. Taking Back Sunday's Notes from the Past also contains a song called "The Ballad of Sal Villanueva".

Discography
36 Crazyfists - Rest Inside the Flames, Roadrunner (Producer/Engineer)
My American Heart - The Meaning in Makeup, Warcon (Producer/Engineer)
Taking Back Sunday - Tell All Your Friends, Victory Records (Producer/Engineer)
Thursday:
Kill the House Lights, Victory Records (Producer/Engineer)
War All the Time, Island/Def Jam (Producer/Engineer)
Five Stories Falling, Victory Records (Producer/Engineer)
Full Collapse, Victory Records	(Producer/Engineer)
Waiting, Eyeball Records (Producer/Engineer)
The Bleeders - As Sweet as Sin, Universal (Producer/Engineer)
Elemno-P - Trouble in Paradise, Universal (Producer/Engineer)	
The Holiday Plan - The Holiday Plan, Universal/Island UK (Producer)
Christiansen - Stylish Nihilists, Revelation Records (Producer/Engineer)
Folly:
Resist Convenience, Triple Crown Records (Producer/Engineer)
Insanity Later, Triple Crown Records
Skarhead - Kings at Crime, Victory Records (Producer/Engineer)
Splitvalves - Movin' On, Resurrection A.D. (Producer)
Maximum Penalty - Independent, IJT Records (Producer)
Faction Zero - Liberation, IJT Records (Producer)
Hades - Downside, Metal Blade	
Demonspeed:
Kill Kill Kill, Black Pumpkin
Swing is Hell, Black Pumpkin 	
Murphy's Law - The Party’s Over, Artemis
Ghost Orgy - Lullabies for Lunatics, Black Pumpkin
Redline - Moments of Truth, GSR Music, Black Pumpkin Distribution
Various Artists - New York’s Hardest, Black Pumpkin
Driver Side Impact - The Very Air We Breathe, Victory Records

References

Year of birth missing (living people)
Living people
Record producers from New York (state)
American people of Italian descent
People from Brooklyn
People from Bensonhurst, Brooklyn